Mindoro's at-large congressional district was the lone congressional district of the Philippines in the historical province of Mindoro for various national legislatures before 1952. The former province elected its representatives province-wide at-large from its reorganization under Article 6 of the Decreto de 18 junio de 1898 y las instrucciones sobre el régimen de las provincias y pueblos for the Malolos Congress in 1898 until its dissolution in 1952 into the present provinces of Occidental Mindoro and Oriental Mindoro. It was a single-member district throughout the ten legislatures of the Insular Government of the Philippine Islands from 1907 to 1935, the three legislatures of the Philippine Commonwealth from 1935 to 1946, and the first two congresses of the Third Philippine Republic from 1946 to 1952.

On two occasions in its history, Mindoro sent more than one member to the national legislatures who were also elected or appointed at-large. Three representatives were sent to the National Assembly (Malolos Congress) of the First Philippine Republic from 1898 to 1901 and two representatives to the National Assembly of the Second Philippine Republic from 1943 to 1944.

After 1952, all representatives were elected from Occidental Mindoro's and Oriental Mindoro's congressional districts.

Representation history

References

Former congressional districts of the Philippines
Mindoro
1898 establishments in the Philippines
1907 establishments in the Philippines
1986 disestablishments in the Philippines
1952 disestablishments in the Philippines
At-large congressional districts of the Philippines
Congressional districts of Mimaropa
Constituencies established in 1898
Constituencies disestablished in 1901
Constituencies established in 1907
Constituencies disestablished in 1950